Canillas is a ward (barrio) of Madrid belonging to the district of Hortaleza. it is also home to Parroquia de Santa Paula(Parish of Saint Paula.

References

Wards of Madrid
Hortaleza